The University of Michigan Men's Glee Club is an all-male glee club (or choir) at the University of Michigan. With roots tracing back to 1859, it is the second oldest glee club in the United States and is the oldest student organization at the university. The club has won the Llangollen International Musical Eisteddfod on four separate occasions. Since 2018, the Club's musical director has been Mark Stover who has continued to expand the Club's repertoire and arranged performances.

The origins of the club stem from a variety of groups that came together in 1876. After a number of years including banjo and mandolin players in the club, it reverted to simply a vocal group by the mid-1920s. It received a substantial rise in profile under the directory of Philip Duey in the 1950s, who organised national, then international tours, and numerous television appearances. Since then, the club has continued to tour internationally at high-profile venues.

The club is entirely managed by students, except for the musical director, taken from the university staff. It has a number of traditions, including the practice of snapping fingers instead of clapping.

Organization
The club is a student-managed organization, which undertakes all management facilities, including all finances and tour arrangements. Only the musical director is a member of the faculty. It accepts members from both undergraduates and graduates of the university, who are chosen by audition. Membership is made up of the majority of the university's 17 colleges.

The group is composed of about 100 singers from several of the schools and colleges at the University of Michigan. They perform repertoire ranging from music of the Renaissance to African-American spirituals. Their official motto is "In Tradition, Camaraderie, and Musical Excellence".

A number of traditions are upheld and recognised by choristers. Club members snap their fingers instead of clapping at each other's achievements (e.g. a good performance on a solo) because it is difficult to clap with a beer in the hand. The club hosts a banquet every spring where awards are presented.

History

Incarnations and early tours
Originally, there were individual Glee Clubs consisting of ten to twenty members, arranged by graduating class. The current framework of a cross-college club started with eight members in 1876, doubling to sixteen in 1877. Amongst their early repertoire included numbers written by Fred Newton Scott. In the 1890s, the organisation gained a banjo and mandolin club,  causing the name to temporarily change to the University Glee, Banjo, and Mandolin Club. A Freshmen Glee Club was active during the 1890s and 1900s.

In the early twentieth century, the club held operas to help raise funds to build the Michigan Union. Because the club was male-only, all female parts were played by men. Several popular songs performed by the club, like "The Bum Army" and "Ann Arbor Days", were written during this time.

In 1908, the club began to be led by the university faculty, although its official history still notes that this was merely an "advisory" role for over a decade later. By 1914, the club included two other groups; the Varsity Quartette and the Midnight Sons, which allowed singers to tackle barbershop and similar music requiring less singers.

The "Banjo" was dropped from the name in 1905, and "Mandolin" in 1923, after which the group concentrated on vocal performances without instrumentation, becoming the University of Michigan Glee Club. The group was renamed the University of Michigan Men's Glee Club in 1938, in reference to a Women's Glee Club that had gained popularity during the 1930s, and between 1944 and 1948 was briefly known as the University of Michigan Varsity Club.

For most of the twentieth century, the club toured locally around Michigan, but did tour across other US states in 1926 and 1941. World War II prevented any touring, which did not resume until 1947.

The Duey years and later tours
Philip Duey took over conducting duties in 1947 and began increasing the Club's profile with radio and television performances. In 1947, the group started recording numbers, including "The Friar's Song" and "'Tis of Michigan We Sing" to be broadcast on local radio. In the fall of 1951, the Glee Club started the tradition of performing joint concerts with the Glee Club of a football opponent when they invited the Cornell Glee Club to Ann Arbor. The following year, they made a national television appearance on Ed Sullivan's "Toast of the Town". In 1954, the Glee Club provided the music for an RKO film, Songs of the Colleges, which featured scenes from colleges and universities from around the country.

The Glee Club had not previously had the membership base or the financial resources to attempt an international trip, but in the spring of 1955, a four-week trip to Western Europe was undertaken. Highlights included an appearance at the American Embassy in Rome and a performance before Queen Juliana of the Netherlands. In 1958, the club made another national television appearance on the Pat Boone Show,

In 1956, Dr. Walter Collins temporarily took over leadership of the club from Duey. During his tenure, an associated group, known as The Friars, was formed. It is named after a former drinking club at the university, and specializes in parodies of popular songs.

The European tour in 1959 commemorated the centennial of the Glee Club. In addition to a four-week concert tour, the group competed in the International Eisteddfod in Llangollen, Wales, one of the world's most significant choral competitions. The boat the club were travelling on was nearly a day late arriving, nearly missing the competition, and they performed having had only three hours sleep. Despite this, the club became the first American choir ever to win the male choir competition.

In 1963, a five-week tour included performances at the residence of the American Ambassador in Athens and the American Embassy in London. The club took first prize in the Llangollen Eisteddfod for a second time, winning over 20 groups from 11 different countries. In 1967, the club undertook a world tour of 17 different nations, including the Soviet Union. The club returned to Llangollen, where they took third place in the contest. third place. In March 1969, Duey retired after 22 years of service.

The club toured Europe again in 1971 with new musical director Willis Patterson and won the Eisteddfod for a third time. This feat was repeated for a fourth time in 1978 under the direction of Leonard Johnson, marking four separate occasions when the club had won the competition. To celebrate their four victories, the Glee Club gives out four "Llangollen Awards" annually to members who embody the spirit of this competition.

Many other highlights come from the Duey years. In September 1965 the Glee Club—along with Harvard University, Smith College, and Howard University—was invited to represent the United States at the first International University Choral Festival. This event was held at Lincoln Center in New York and at the National Cathedral in Washington, D.C.

Modern era

The club performed the pre-game festivities for the final game of the 1984 World Series at Tiger Stadium, but their performance was overshadowed by scenes of violence and rioting after the game. Their tour bus was set upon by rioters, who vandalised it, while the singers fled to safety. A more favourable appearance occurred the following year when, under the direction of Patrick Gardner, the club undertook a 36-day tour across Europe, which culminated in another appearance at Llangollen, where they placed third.

Under the direction of Jerry Blackstone, the Michigan Men's Glee Club embarked on four major overseas tours. In 1989 the Glee Club spent three weeks touring Asia with concerts in Hong Kong, Japan, and South Korea. In 1992 the Club embarked on a trip to Eastern Europe, where they were one of the first American groups to visit the new country of Estonia, which had recently declared independence from the defunct Soviet Union. 1996 brought the Club to South America including Brazil, Argentina, Uruguay, Chile, and Peru, and the Club most recently traversed Australia in 2000. The highlight of this tour was the inaugural Men of Song Festival hosted by the Brisbane Boys' College in which 140 pupils participated in a workshop and joint concert.

Under Blackstone's direction the Club was invited to perform at several conventions of the American Choral Directors Association, including the 1997 National Convention in San Diego. The Club also released six compact discs during this time and was featured on Mannheim Steamroller's 2001 album Christmas Extraordinaire, with Blackstone co-credited as choir director. In the spring of 2001 the combined Men's Glee Club and Smith College Glee Club and Chorale gave a performance of Brahms' Ein deutsches Requiem in Northampton, Massachusetts. The following fall the endeavor was repeated in Hill Auditorium with the Smith and Michigan Women's Glee Clubs. Blackstone retired in 2002, with the club's CD I have had singing being a retrospective of his tenure as conductor. His time spent conducting the club has been well-received, with the secretary of the Warsaw Philharmonica stating, "I was completely enchanted. It is unbelievable that an amateur group could surpass our most professional choirs with such ease of execution."

Stephen Lusmann took over leadership until 2005; highlights of his tenure include an appearance at the Intercollegiate Men's Choruses National Convention at Harvard University, a sixteen-day tour of Great Britain and Ireland in 2004 and the club's premiere performance at Carnegie Hall with the Smith College Glee Club in 2005.

From 2005 to 2011, the Club was under the direction of Paul Rardin. Notable achievements during this time include international tours to Spain in 2008 and Cuba in 2011. The Cuban tour was considered especially significant, given that Americans have not easily been able to travel to the country legally, but the University gave financial assistance and an offer of a cultural exchange to make the tour happen. In 2010, the club celebrated its 150th anniversary, and as part of the celebrations performed a set of joint concerts with the Harvard University and University of Virginia Glee Clubs, taking a variety of music including contemporary American songs, folk and Renaissance music. Rardin said "It's a wonderful opportunity for all of us to see, hear and learn from three different ensembles."

Rardin left the University of Michigan after the Cuban tour to accept the position of Director of Choirs at Temple University in 2011. As of the fall term of 2011, Eugene Rogers assumed direction of the club. Notable achievements during his tenure include an international tour to China in 2012, a major tour of the East Coast of the United States which concluded in a joint concert with the Glee Clubs of Harvard and Yale Universities, and the nationwide extension of the Club's Brothers in Song program which partners with underserved young men's choral programs in public schools. As of 2018, Mark Stover has been directing the group. There was a planned spring 2020 tour to South America.

The club continues to collaborate with others. Tom Harle, MD of the Naperville Glee Club said "There's a lot to be said about them. They're one of the most prestigious and one of the oldest men's glee clubs in the country."

List of directors

Notable alumni

Ara Berberian, Metropolitan Opera Basso
Russell Christopher, Metropolitan Opera, Baritone.
Thomas Dewey, three-time governor of New York and two-time Republican Presidential candidate
Dr. Sanjay Gupta, Neurosurgeon, and CNN senior medical correspondent.
Jeff Marx, co-composer of Avenue Q.
Bob McGrath, singer and actor who formerly played "Bob" on Sesame Street.

See also
 List of collegiate glee clubs
 Yale Glee Club

References
Citations

Books

External links
Official Website
Facebook Page
YouTube Page
SoundCloud Page
The Friars

1859 establishments in Michigan
University of Michigan
Michigan
Michigan
Musical groups established in 1859